The TR6 Trophy is a motorcycle that was made by Triumph, in Meriden, from 1956 to 1973, when it was replaced by the five-speed 750-cc Triumph Tiger TR7V. During this time, it was a successful model, particularly in the US. The competition variant, popularly known as the "desert sled", won numerous competitions throughout the late 1950s and 1960s. Steve McQueen's fondness for the model is well known, as is his participation in the 1964 ISDT on a TR6 Trophy.

Background 
The genesis of the model came with the introduction of the 650-cc Thunderbird Model in 1950. This was released to meet the demand for higher-capacity motorcycles, particularly from the United States, Triumph's largest export market. In 1954, the T110 model was introduced, a higher performance version of the Thunderbird. The success of these models and the 500-cc TR5 Trophy led to the creation of a 650-cc TR6 Trophy model. The TR6 was developed and produced specifically for the US market, in particular, California desert racing.

Pre-unit models 
The model was introduced in 1956 and named the TR6 Trophy-bird, borrowing its name from the Thunderbird model. The model used the same engine as the T110, but with the new "Delta" alloy cylinder head. The cast iron barrel was retained, but painted silver. The engine used 8.5:1 compression ratio and developed 42 bhp. The power delivery made the mount ideal for off-road competition, for which the model is well known. The bike sported a 'siamese' (two-into-one) exhaust system and a 7-inch front brake. Another feature taken from the TR5 was the quick-detachable headlamp, which was ideal for bikes ridden to competitive events and back again. This used a multipin connector which plugged into the bottom of the headlamp shell.

For 1957, the front brake was enlarged to 8 inches. The TR6 was now fitted with a Lucas Red Label Competition Magneto as standard. 
This was the first year of the "Harmonica" tank badge. For the 1959 model year, the Trophy was offered in two variants, the TR6/A and TR6/B. The TR6/A was the roadster model with low pipes and the TR6/B was the high-piped street-scrambler. 
After Edward Turner, the fabled Triumph designer, witnessed the death of a young rider on a TR6, at the 1960 Big Bear Run, due to frame failure, it immediately received a stronger steering head. For 1961, the "Trophy-Bird" name was replaced with simply "Trophy". The home model was named the TR6, whereas the US export models were named TR6C for the competition model and TR6R for the road model. Ruby Red and Silver were used for all models. For 1962, the US models were renamed TR6SR and TR6SC. Introduced in 1962 and offered through 1966 was the TR6SS model, which sported a two-into-one exhaust, but was otherwise similar to the road model. The TR6SS used the cheaper K2F magneto rather than the competition K2FC used previously.

Unit construction, before oil-in-frame models 

Like the other 650-cc models, the Trophy gained unit construction in 1963. Coil ignition replaced the magneto. For 1964, the bike received stronger front forks, which improved handling. The Smiths Chronometric instruments were replaced by the magnetic type. In 1965, a locating pin for finding top dead center was added to allow timing without the use of a dial gauge.

In 1966, the tank badge style changed from the "Harmonica" style to the "Eyebrow". Confusingly, the model designators for the US now reverted to TR6R and TR6C. The electrics changed to 12 volts, and a bigger 6-pint oil tank was added. The front brake drum was redesigned to allow a larger braking surface. TR6C models had a smaller teardrop  tank without the parcel grid.

For 1967, the TR6 received some engine changes. Compression was raised to 9:1. and Bonneville exhaust valves and camshaft were adopted, resulting in a 5-bhp increase. This year was the beginning of the shift to unified threads. The TR6C got twin high pipes on the left side.

The twin leading shoe brake was adopted in 1968. This year had the introduction of the Amal Concentric carburettor. The TR6R was the "Sport" version with low pipes, and the TR6C was the "Trophy Special" with high pipes and folding footpegs. The TR6C Trophy Special was built at the request of Triumph's sole US distributor at the time, Johnson Motors in southern California, as a way to target the growing number of desert riders. It was fitted with Dunlop Trials Universal block-tread tires and was the model referred to as the "Desert Sled". 

The TR6 and TR6R were renamed Tiger for 1969, leaving the TR6C model with the Trophy name. The front brake used a modified actuating lever to avoid snagging of the cable on the front mudguard. Other changes included the larger RM21 alternator and twin Windtone horns. The signature parcel grid was finally dropped for all models.

The last year before the 'oil-in-frame' was adopted was 1970. The exhausts on the TR6C received the "barbecue grill" heat shields.

Oil-in-frame models 

In 1971, the TR6R Tiger and TR6C Trophy adopted the P39 frame like the other 650 models. The twin high pipes were retained on the left side. 
The main improvement over the previous models was the handling, helped by the stronger frame and improved front forks. However, many problems occurred with these new models. The oil capacity was reduced, causing the engine to run hot and the new 'conical' hub front brake required frequent adjustment to avoid fade. The new electrics proved unreliable. Mid-year changes attempted to correct these problems. For 1972, a five-speed was offered as an option, thus creating the TR6RV and TR6CV models. The TR6 model ended in 1973 when it was replaced by the 750-cc TR7 model.

Police models 

Before using the Trophy, UK police forces successfully deployed Speed Twin and Thunderbird models. The Trophy version, codenamed the TR6P, carried the model name "Saint" (Stop Anything In No Time). 
These had a special petrol tank which typically accommodated a PYE radio telephone. It had panniers, a fairing or leg shields. These were sold between 1967 and 1973. The factory varied the specification slightly according to the needs of the individual police force.

A rare TR6SS model was produced for the US police. It is not known if these were ever used for police duties. 
In 1967, Triumph marketed the Saint model to the US public as a replacement for the beloved but discontinued Thunderbird model.

Model production quantities 
Listed here are the production quantities for the various models for each year.

Competition 
Listed here are all known competition wins with the TR6 Trophy.

Steve McQueen and the 1964 International Six Day Trials 
In 1964, the US ISDT team, including the Ekins brothers and Steve McQueen travelled to East Germany. Brand new TR6SC and T100SC models were collected from Meriden for the competition. Cliff Coleman achieved third place in the up to 750 cc class and Dave Ekins gained fifth place in the 500 cc. Bud Ekins and Steve McQueen both crashed on the third day, Ekins with a broken ankle. The Steve McQueen bike has been rediscovered and is now owned by Sean and Catherine Kelly of Johnson Motors.

Appearance in The Great Escape 
]]
The motorcycles used during chase scene in film The Great Escape were 1961 Triumph TR6 Trophy models disguised as German BMW R75 motorcycles. The star of the movie, Steve McQueen, did much of the riding for the film himself, although Bud Ekins performed the famous jump scene as McQueen's stunt double. Pin-striper and artist Von Dutch converted the motorcycles for the movie while working at Ekins' shop.

Notes

References 

}
}
}
}

TR6 Trophy
Standard motorcycles
Vehicles introduced in 1956
Motorcycles powered by straight-twin engines